Watt station may refer to:

Transportation
Watt/I-80 station, a light rail station in Sacramento, California
Watt/I-80 West station, a light rail station in Sacramento, California
Watt/Manlove station, a light rail station in Sacramento, California
Regensdorf-Watt railway station, a railway station in Switzerland

Other uses
WATT, an AM radio station in Cadillac, Michigan

See also
KivuWatt Power Station, a thermal power plant in Kibuye, Rwanda
Watts Station, an historic rail station in Los Angeles, California
103rd Street/Watts Towers station, a light rail station in Los Angeles, California